Aleksander Rimmel (1888 Võlla Parish (now Tori Parish), Kreis Pernau – ?) was an Estonian politician. He was a member of II Riigikogu. He was a member of the Riigikogu since 5 June 1924. He replaced Johanna Andreesen. On 22 November 1924, he was removed from his position and he was replaced by Georg Jürgenson.

References

1888 births
Year of death missing
People from Tori Parish
People from Kreis Pernau
Workers' United Front politicians
Members of the Riigikogu, 1923–1926